Susie Monroe (March 4, 1885 - November 7, 1968) was a teacher, dressmaker, salon owner, and state representative in Pennsylvania. She was a Democrat who lived in Philadelphia.

She was born in Jacksonville, Florida. She graduated from St. Athanasius High School. She served in the Pennsylvania House of Representatives from 1949 until her death in 1968. She was buried at Rolling Green Memorial Park in West Chester, Pennsylvania.

He 1948 campaign poster was auctioned.  She was photographed in her home in 1958.

References

20th-century American women politicians
Democratic Party members of the Pennsylvania House of Representatives
20th-century American women educators
1885 births
1968 deaths
Politicians from Jacksonville, Florida
Women state legislators in Pennsylvania
20th-century American politicians
Burials in Pennsylvania
20th-century American educators
Politicians from Philadelphia
Saloonkeepers
Schoolteachers from Pennsylvania